PCLinuxOS, often shortened to PCLOS, is an x86-64 Linux distribution, with KDE Plasma Desktop, MATE and XFCE as its default user interfaces. It is primarily free software operating system for personal computers aimed at ease of use. It is considered a rolling release.

History
The precursor to PCLinuxOS was a set of RPM packages created to improve successive versions of Mandrake Linux (later Mandriva Linux). These packages were created by Bill Reynolds, a packager better known as Texstar. From 2000 to 2003, Texstar maintained his repository of RPM packages in parallel with the PCLinuxOnline site. In an interview, Reynolds said he started PCLinuxOS "to provide an outlet for [his] crazy desire to package source code without having to deal with egos, arrogance, and politics."

In October 2003, Texstar created a fork of Mandrake Linux 9.2. Working closely with The Live CD Project, Texstar has since developed that fork independently into a full-fledged distribution. The initial releases were successively numbered as "previews": p5, p7, p8 up to p81a, then p9, p91, p92, and p93.

Although it retains a similar "look and feels" to Mandriva Linux, PCLinuxOS has diverged significantly. The code was officially forked from Mandrake 9.2 into an independent project in 2003. After three years of continuous development, the developers took advantage of further development in (the renamed) Mandriva late in 2006 for PCLinuxOS 2007. In the releases before 2007, it was normally necessary to perform a re-installation.

PCLinuxOS 2007
For 2007, PCLinuxOS used a one-time source code snapshot from Mandriva to produce a new independent code base (no longer a fork of Mandriva). This implied a shift to a more modern code, which required a complete reinstallation of this version. The new version featured a new look and built-in 3D effects. A new logo was also designed for the new version and was incorporated into the boot screen. A new login screen was designed, entitled "Dark". The final/official PCLinuxOS 2007 version was released on May 21, 2007.

PCLinuxOS 2009
The last version of the 2009 Live CD, PCLinuxOS 2009.2, was released on June 30, 2009. Improvements included bug fixes, new backgrounds, sounds, and start-up screen, as well as quicker start-up times. It was the last PCLinuxOS live CD to ship with K Desktop Environment 3, and the last of the PCLinuxOS 2007 backward compatible series.

Remasters of PCLinuxOS, featuring the Xfce (Phoenix), LXDE (PCLinuxOS-LXDE), and Gnome (PCLinuxOS-Gnome) desktops were also made available.

PCLinuxOS 2010
The 2010 version of the Live CD was released on April 19, 2010. It includes the new KDE SC 4.4.2, a new graphical theme and a new version of the Linux Kernel (Kernel 2.6.32.11). It is also the first PCLinuxOS Live CD to include the ext4 file system support. This version required a complete reinstall of the operating system.

While a version of PCLinuxOS that features the GNOME desktop environment was introduced in 2008, the 2010 version is the first one to not only offer the KDE Plasma and GNOME versions, but also versions with Xfce, LXDE, Enlightenment, and Openbox.

PCLinuxOS 2010.1
Version 2010.1 was released on May 5, 2010. Changes made since the last version:
 [The] Kernel has been updated to version 2.6.32.12-bfs.
 KDE Plasma Desktop has been upgraded to version 4.4.3.
 Support has been added for Realtek RTL8191SE/RTL8192SE WiFi cards and Microdia webcams.
 Vim console text editor and udftools have been added.
 Fixed CD-ROM ejection when using the Copy to RAM feature.
 Fixed KDE new widget download. Updated nVIDIA (195.36.24) and ATi fglrx (8.723) drivers.
 Updated all supporting applications and libraries from the software repository which include security updates and bug fixes.

PCLinuxOS 2011.6
PCLinuxOS 2011.6 version was released on June 27, 2011.

PCLinuxOS 2012
PCLinuxOS 2012.02 version was released on February 22, 2012. Later another maintenance release was made on August 22, 2012. Major changes compared to the 2011 release are:
 Kernel has been updated to version 3.2
 KDE version 4.8.2
 nVIDIA and ATi fglrx driver support

PCLinuxOS 2013 64-bit
PCLinuxOS 2013 64-bit first version was released on April 10, 2013.

It featured:
 Kernel 3.2.18-pclos2.bfs for maximum desktop performance.
 Full KDE 4.10.1 Desktop.
 nVIDIA and ATi fglrx driver support.
 Multimedia playback support for many popular formats.
 Wireless support for many network devices.
 Printer support for many local and networked printer devices.
 Addlocale: allows you to translate PCLinuxOS into over 60 languages.
 LibreOffice preinstalled.
 LibreOffice Manager can install LibreOffice supporting over 100 languages.
 MyLiveCD allows you to take a snapshot of your installation and burn it to a LiveCD/DVD.
 PCLinuxOS-liveusb – allows you to install PCLinuxOS on a USB key disk.

PCLinuxOS 2014.7

The new version was released on July 7, 2014.

Features:
 kernel 3.15.4 for maximum desktop performance.
 Full KDE 4.12.3 Desktop.
 Nvidia and ATI fglrx driver support.
 Multimedia playback support for many popular formats.
 Wireless support for many network devices.
 Printer support for many local and networked printer devices.
 Addlocale allows you to convert PCLinuxOS into over 60 languages.
 LibreOffice Manager can install LibreOffice supporting over 100 languages.
 MyLiveCD allows you to take a snapshot of your installation and burn it to a LiveCD/DVD.
 PCLinuxOS-liveusb allows you to install PCLinuxOS on a USB key disk.

Features
PCLinuxOS places specific emphasis on desktop computing, concentrating its efforts on home or small business environments, hence paying less attention to other more "traditional" uses, like servers, although packages for most server tasks are available.

PCLinuxOS is distributed as a Live CD, which can also be installed on a local hard disk drive or USB flash drive. Beginning from version 2009.1 PCLinuxOS provides a USB installer to create a Live USB, where the user's configuration and personal data can be saved if desired.  A live USB of older versions of PCLinuxOS can be created manually or with UNetbootin. The entire CD can be run from memory, assuming the system has sufficient RAM. PCLinuxOS uses APT-RPM, based on APT (Debian), a package management system (originally from the Debian distribution), together with Synaptic Package Manager, a GUI to APT, to add, remove or update packages. If there is enough memory on the machine, and an active network connection, the Live CD can update packages. PCLinuxOS is also designed to be easy to remaster after installation, creating one's personalized Live CD, using the mylivecd tool.

PCLinuxOS maintains its software repository, available via the Advanced Packaging Tool (APT) and its Synaptic front-end, completely replacing Mandriva's urpmi. This means that an installation could be continuously updated to the latest versions of packages, hence sometimes forgoing the need to re-install the entire distribution upon each successive release. Other differences include its menu arrangement, custom graphics, and icon sets.

End of official support for 32bit version
On May 10, 2016, main developer Texstar announced the end of support for 32bit versions of PCLinuxOS. As a result, 32bit ISOs of the distribution, official 32bit package updates and forum support ceased availability. While this doesn't prevent unofficial support, following the announcement only 64bit ISO images and package updates are available through the official webpage and channels.

Other versions 
There are several community projects associated with PCLinuxOS.

KDE Fullmonty (FM) edition (Discontinued)
KDE FullMonty (Live & Install DVD) is a regular PCLinuxOS KDE installation but is modified to include a special desktop layout and many additional applications and drives preinstalled. It is available as either a 32- or 64-bit edition.

Trinity edition
The Trinity edition of PCLinuxOS comes in 2 flavours, a mini-me that is a minimalist iso for those that want to customize their desktop with only the programs they want.

The Other is Big Daddy, which includes all the codecs for multimedia, office tools, and more out-of-the-box programs.

LXQt edition
PCLinuxOS offers LXQt ISO which offers old LXQt desktop environment. The ISO size is approximately 2.1G which comes with LXQt's suite of applications including several third-party applications.

Xfce edition
PCLOS community edition featuring XFCE desktop in a rolling release offers easy installation and setup, easy to update, and works out of the box without systemd a lot like MX-17 but non-expiring. Bluetooth easiest working distro.

MATE edition
The newest edition of PCLinuxOS incorporates the MATE desktop environment, announced on the 3rd of July 2013. PCLinuxOS Mate ISO is available in 64bit flavor only. This ISO is small enough to fit on a standard 700 MB CD or a small USB key.
Features: Mate Desktop 1.6.x, Kernel 3.4.52, Pulse Audio enabled by default, Udisks2, Hal daemon turn off but still available as a service if needed. All of the Mate desktop applications plus Firefox, Thunderbird, Pidgin, and Skype. Clementine and VLC multimedia players. PysolFC for recreation.

Third-party distributions

Because PCLinuxOS includes the mklivecd script, there have been several third-party distributions over the years based on PCLinuxOS, though they may only mention that connection if they follow strict guidelines.

Release history
Almost all major releases have been accompanied by new boot-up and login screens, along with some changes in icon sets, and login sounds.

See also 

 APT-RPM
 Mandriva Linux
 Rolling release

References

External links
 PCLinuxOS Magazine
 
 PCLinux OS in OpenSourceFeed Gallery

KDE
Live CD
Live USB
Mandriva Linux
Operating system distributions bootable from read-only media
RPM-based Linux distributions
Linux distributions without systemd
X86-64 Linux distributions
Rolling Release Linux distributions
Linux distributions